Kovács or Kovacs, meaning blacksmith, is one of the most common Hungarian family names.

History
The name is found in Hungary and Hungarian expatriate communities. There are similar names with the Kováts or Kovách spellings. The name means "blacksmith" in Hungarian, and it is a loanword from Slavic languages. There are 221,688 people in Hungary who are named Kovács, making the name the second most common family name among Hungarians.

Cognates
 Covaci in Romania
 Koufax in Yiddish
 Kovač in many South Slavic and West Slavic communities
 Kováč in Slovakia
 Kovach, the Carpatho-Ruthenian form
 Kovachev in Bulgaria
 Kovaçi in Albania
 Kaval in Belarus (also Kavalchuk, Kavalenka, Kavaliou, Kavalski, Kavalchyk, Kavalevich)
 Koval in Ukraine (also Kovalchuk, Kovalenko, Kovalev)
 Kovář (also Kováč) in Czech Republic.
 Kowal in Poland (also Kowalczyk, Kowalski)

Notable people
 Ágnes Kovács (born 1981), Hungarian swimmer
 Angela Kovács (born 1964), Swedish actress
 Barbara Kovács (born 1993), Hungarian racewalker
 Balázs Kovács (born 1977), Hungarian hurdler
 Bill Kovacs (1949–2006), American pioneer of commercial computer animation technology
 Dan Kovacs (born 1970), American powerlifter
 Dénes Kovács (1930–2005), Hungarian violinist
 Edit Kovács (fencer) (born 1954), Hungarian foil fencer
 Edit Kovács (swimmer) (born 1951), Hungarian swimmer
 Ella Kovacs (born 1964), Romanian middle distance runner
 Ernie Kovacs (1919–1962), American entertainer
 Ervin Kováts (1927–2012), Hungarian-born Swiss chemist known for the Kovats retention index
 Frank Kovacs (1919–1990),  American tennis player
 Fred Kovacs, American soccer player
 Gábor Kovács (financier) (born 1957), Hungarian financier, banker, art collector, philanthropist and founder of KOGART
 Greg Kovacs (born 1968), American bodybuilder
 Iván Kovács (born 1970), Hungarian épée fencer
 János Kovács (born 1985), Hungarian footballer
 Joe Kovacs (puppeteer) (born 1967), American puppeteer
 Joe Kovacs (born 1989), American track and field athlete
 Julie Kovacs (born 1959), American chemist
 Kálmán Kovács (disambiguation)
 Katalin Kovács (born 1976), Hungarian canoer
 Ladislav Kovács (born 1991), Slovak Counter-Strike: Global Offensive player
 László Kovács (politician) (born 1939), Hungarian politician and diplomat
 László Kovács (cinematographer) (1933–2007), Hungarian-American cinematographer
 Magda Kósáné Kovács (1940-2020), Hungarian politician and Member of the European Parliament
 Michal Kováč (1930-2016), first president of Slovakia
 Mišo Kovač (born 1941), Croatian singer
 Margit Kovács (1902–1977) Hungarian ceramist and sculptor
 Pál Kovács (1912–1995), Hungarian saber fencer
 Péter Kovács (footballer) (born 1978), Hungarian footballer
 Richard Kovacs (1885–1950), physician
 Robin Kovacs (born 1996), Swedish ice hockey player
 Rita Kovács (born 1970), Hungarian swimmer
 Sándor J. Kovács (born 1947), Hungarian-American cardiologist
 Sandy Koufax (born 1935), American baseball player
 Sharon Kovacs (born 1990), Dutch singer
Stephen Kovacs (1972–2022), saber fencer and fencing coach, charged with sexual assault, died in prison
 István Kovács (footballer born 1920) (1920–1995), Romanian football manager
 Viktor Kovács (born 1973), Hungarian track and field athlete
 Zoltán Kovács (ice hockey) (born 1962), Hungarian ice hockey coach and administrator
 Zsófia Kovács (triathlete) (born 1988), Hungarian triathlete

Fictional characters 
 Takeshi Kovacs, a fictional character in three books by Richard Morgan
 Walter Kovacs, the identity of the character Rorschach, in the DC Comic series Watchmen
 Kirilli Kovacs, a character in Darren Shan's series, The Demonata.

References

Hungarian-language surnames
Hungarian words and phrases
Occupational surnames